Steen River Airport  is located adjacent to Steen River, Alberta, Canada.

References

Registered aerodromes in Alberta
Mackenzie County